Brian Ah Yat (born November 12, 1975) is a former American football quarterback who played three seasons with the Winnipeg Blue Bombers of the Canadian Football League. He played college football at the University of Montana. He was also a member of the Hawaii Hammerheads and Chicago Rush. Ah Yat became a free agent in February 2002 after playing 45 games for the Blue Bombers. He currently serves as the offensive coordinator and quarterbacks coach at Damien Memorial School.

References

External links
Just Sports Stats

1975 births
American sportspeople of Chinese descent
Players of American football from Honolulu
Players of Canadian football from Honolulu
American football quarterbacks
Canadian football quarterbacks
Montana Grizzlies football players
Winnipeg Blue Bombers players
Chicago Rush players
Living people
Hawaii people of Chinese descent
High school football coaches in Hawaii